The Mosaic ceiling of the Florence Baptistery is a set of mosaics covering the internal dome and apses of the Baptistery of Florence. It is one of the most important cycles of medieval Italian mosaics, created between 1225 and around 1330 using designs by major Florentine painters such as Cimabue, Coppo di Marcovaldo, Meliore and the Master of the Magdalen, probably by mosaicists from Venice.

History

The first mosaics were created in the apse by the Franciscan monk Jacopo, whom Vasari's Lives of the Artists wrongly supposed to be Jacopo Torriti. An inscription split between the four apses gives the start-date for the work.

Producing the mosaics was a difficult and expensive undertaking. The Arte di Calimala was responsible for decorating and maintaining the Baptistery and in 1271 it signed an agreement with the canons to start decorating the interior of the dome, though it is now thought that the mosaics on the portion nearest the lantern may have been begun in 1228 by the same Jacopo, soon after the "scarsella" (rectangular apse) was completed. The works continued until the start of the 14th century, ending around 1330, as reported by a passage in the work of Giovanni Villani. 

According to Vasari the earliest mosaics was by Andrea Tafi, a semi-legendary figure, who produced the angelic hierarchies and the Pantocrator assisted by Apollonio, a Greek he had met in Venice. He attributed the rest of the work to Gaddo Gaddi. It is impossible to confirm Vasari's account, though the earliest mosaics are also the most similar to those in San Marco Basilica, Santa Maria Assunta Basilica, other Venetian locations and Rome's San Paolo fuori le Mura, where the Venetian masters also worked after being summoned by Pope Honorius III in 1218.

Most art historians now attribute the compositions to a number of Tuscan artists but their realisation to mosaicists from Venice or the eastern Mediterranean. Stylistic analogies with painted works enable links with the best 13th century masters, their collaborators, Giotto and the 'proto-Giottists' such as the so-called Last Master of the Baptistery identified by Roberto Longhi. The works have been under almost constant restoration from the late 14th century onwards, with particularly notable schemes occurring in 1402, 1481, 1483–1499 (overseen by Alesso Baldovinetti, who was made "official restorer of the mosaic decoration"), 1781–1782 (general cleaning), 1821–1823 (dealing with serious damage in the area of Stories of Noah) and 1898–1907 (massive reintegration).

Iconography

Apse
The double arch over the altar is decorated with busts of Christ, the Virgin Mary, the apostles and prophets, divided into compartments and decorated with leaves, possibly later work from the end of the 13th century. On the rectangular apse is a frieze with cherubim and seraphim between clipei, over which are the vault mosaics by Brother Jacopo, which show some connection with those in San Marco Basilica in Venice.

At either end are mixti-linear figures with inscribed tablets above them – on these are four very ornate capitals in lively colours with very articulated lines, on which stand four telamons, folded to look like wheels. The telamons have a lively plasticity and resemble sculptures by the studio of Benedetto Antelami on the facade of Fidenza Cathedral. To the left side of the telamons is an enthroned John the Baptist and to the right the Madonna and Child enthroned – both those panels are heavily restored, particularly the heads. The thrones are modelled on Carolingian and Ottonian miniature painting.

The wheel's structure is formed of classical swirls with rays containing candelabra, whose fantastical composition seem to anticipate 15th and 16th century grotesque art. Below is a vase between two facing animals such as deer (recalling Psalm 41's "as the deer seeks water, so the soul seeks God"), birds and strange fish-men with fins on their heads. 

Above is a vegetable motif with a small head in the middle and higher up an angel holding the large central medallion, in which is written "Agnus Dei". Around the medallion is inscribed "HIC DEUS EST MAGNUS MITIS QUEM DENOTAT AGNUS" ("here is great God shown as a mild lamb") in gold letters on a red background. Between the rays are eight full-length depictions of prophets in Byzantine style with name labels at their feet – anticlockwise these are Moses, Abraham, Isaac, Jacob, Daniel, Ezekiel, Jermiah and Isaiah.

Dome

Covered with mosaics on gold backgrounds, the interior of the dome is split into eight segments. Some argue Venetian masters were involved, with local artists such as Coppo di Marcovaldo (Hell) and Meliore di Jacopo (parts of Paradise) providing cartoons.

The upper frieze (2) shows the angelic hierarchies around all eight segments, whilst the rest of three segments (1) shows the Last Judgement, dominated by a huge figure of Christ, under whose feet is shown the resurrection of the dead. To Christ's right are shown the just welcomed into heaven, whilst on the left is hell and its devils.

The other five segments are subdivided into four horizontal registers showing (from top to bottom) stories from the Book of Genesis (3) and the lives of Joseph (4), the Virgin Mary (5), Christ (5) and John the Baptist (6). The first scenes from the Baptist's life are thought to be from cartoons by the Master of the Magdalen and Cimabue.

Angelic hierarchies

The closest part to the centre of the dome contains a series of frames with lively plant-form decoration, followed by a band with spirals and rhythmic figurative images reminiscent of the wheel in the apse – in each corner is a kind of vase made of fantastical plant elements, aligned to small columns in the lowest register. From the vases emerge two stalks which create large volutes and a central branch. Where the symmetrical volutes join and above the central elements are small heads between clipei and under the volutes are elaborate fountains, from which deer, peacocks, rams, herons and other animals drink, all based on early Christian art. Below this band runs a frame of shells.

The next ring illustrates Pseudo-Dionysius's angelic hierarchies with captioned images. At the centre is Christ Blessing, with an open book in his hand and flanked by red seraphim and blue cherubim, with the closest to him distinct in having three pairs of wings. Next, alternating from left to right and separated by small columns, are two pairs of each kind of angel. These all have two wings and are all identical to their pair, except for those on the same axis as Christ which are mirror images of each other:
Thrones – charged with bearing God's throne in heaven and shown holding shining mandorlas, a conventional Byzantine symbol for God's throne
Dominions – the order of the universe depends on them; they are shown with a long sceptre surmounted by a three-leafed clover, a symbol of the Holy Trinity
Virtues – charged with dispensing God's grace; they call demons out of small possessed men seated on blocks beside them
Powers – charged with distributing powers to humanity and shown wearing crested helmets
Principalities – charged with watching over the nations and shown holding crusader banners
Archangels – the major counsellors sent from heaven, they are shown dressed in elegant robes and holding cartouches, symbolising God's messages
Angels – the closest rank of angel to humans and thus put in charge of their preoccupations

According to Pietro Toesca, the artist behind the first register was the same brother Jacopo who worked on the rectangular apse, assisted by Venetian masters. The angelic hierarchies are traditionally attributed to Andrea Tafi and Apollonio, though Ragghianti argues Coppo di Marcovaldo produced the cartoon for the figure of Christ and the Master of the Maddalena that for the Powers.

Last Judgement

The three segments above the altar show the Last Judgement, with the centre almost completely filled by a figure of Christ the Judge seated on the Circles of Paradise and holding out his hands, showing his wounds from the Crucifixion, one facing palm up and the other palm down, directing souls to heaven and hell respectively. The large feet also show the wounds from the Crucifixion – their staggered pose, the robe's complex pleats and the side view of the legs avoid a rigid frontal effect, highlighted with golden tesserae. The cruciform halo includes mirror-like enamel cubes, also included in the border of the mandorla around Christ. Either side of the mandorla are three parallel registers, with two almost symmetrical hosts of angels at the top bearing symbols of Christ's passion and attributes of the Judgement, along with two angels sounding the last trumpet of the Apocalypse summoning the dead from their graves at Christ's feet.

In the second register are the Virgin Mary (with raised hands to Christ's right), John the Baptist (holding a scroll to Christ's left) and the twelve apostles seated on two long benches decorated as thrones. Each apostle holds an open book with characters from a different alphabet to show their taking the Gospel to the whole world after Pentecost. Behind the backrests and between the saints are angel heads, alternating in tilt from right then to left. Ragghianti (1957) assigned these scenes to Meliore, particularly comparing the figure of St Peter to Meliore's Christ the Redeemer with Four Saints (Uffizi).

The lower register shows Paradise to the right and Hell to the left, with the souls taken to their destinations by angels and devils. The elect are driven towards a group giving thanks to God and accompanied by a large angel holding a scroll reading "Venite Beneditti Patris Mei / Ossidete Preparatum" ("Come, [ye] blessed of my father / sit in the places prepared [for you]") towards the Heavenly Jerusalem. Another angel in gem-decorated clothes opens the gateway to a small man, dragging him by the hand. In the city three large patriarchs sit holding small sweetbreads in their laps amidst extraordinary colourful plants in a green flower-dotted meadow, the latter symbolised by a band. In the front row of the elect are a king and a Dominican monk, followed by three virgins, bishops, a monk and a priest.

Art historians unanimously attribute the composition of the scene of Hell to Coppo di Marcovaldo, with less skillful areas by other hands. Hideous devils with black bat-wings push the damned towards Christ's left. The damned souls trample and crowd each other, covering their eyes and mouths in disgust. Hell is dominated by a large Satan on a flaming throne, eating a man and trampling the damned while snakes growing out of his ears bite at them. Monsters shaped like snakes, frogs and lizards also emerge from his body and attack the damned, emphasising Satan's insatiable nature. Satan's ass's ears underline his feral nature and are attributes of Lucifer and the Antichrist, whilst his horns derive from the Celtic god Cernunnos and symbolise the Church's defeat of paganism. Devils also throw the damned into pits, impale and mutilate them, burn them on spits, throw them around and force them to drink molten gold. One group of damned souls is wrapped in flames.

Stories from Genesis
In the first register below the angelic hierarchies are stories from the Book of Genesis, three in each segment. Anti-clockwise, these show:

Stories of Joseph
In the second register below the angelic hierarchies are stories from the life of Joseph, also divided into three per segment and read anti-clockwise:

Lives of Mary and Christ

Stories of St John the Baptist
The Baptistery is dedicated to John the Baptist and the scenes from his life occupy the lowest register on the dome. They run in the same sequence as the other scenes, though with more scenes due to the longer space available in this register:

Women's galleries
The last part of the interior to have mosaics added were the women's galleries between approximately 1300 and 1330. These show angels and saints and their style agrees with Giovanni Villani's written evidence, which dates their completion to 1330 and probably dates the start of work to around 1300–1315. There are no art historical studies specifically on the mosaics of the women's galleries, though Venturi briefly notes that they were produced after 1300. The vault has a central motif of a starry sky, symbolic of the Empyrean, surrounded by angels with unclear attributes, possibly another set of angelic hierarchies.

Other mosaics

A frieze of panels runs around the base of the dome, showing saints, dating to the late 14th century from drawings by Lippo di Corso. They show saints:

Ambrose
Gregory Nazianzenus (?)
Jerome
Augustine
Stephen
Leo
Isidore
Philip (?)
Sylvester
Nicholas of Bari
Unknown Martyr Deacon
Ignatius
Dionysius
Unknown Deacon
Basil
Protasius (?)
Gregory the Great
Cyprian the Bishop
Vincent
Fulgentius
Martin
Unknown Deacon
Zanobius
Hilarius
Lawrence (?)
John Chrysostom (?)

The women's galleries instead bear panels of prophets and patriarchs, attributed to the late 13th century Gaddo Gaddi by Vasari, who also states they were produced without studio assistance, though modern art historians also recognise the hands of his workshop and Andrea Tafi in them. They show:

Isaiah
Jeremiah
Daniel
Ezekiel
Hosea
Joel
Obadiah
Amos
Micah
Jonah (?)
Nahum
Habbakuk
Zephaniah
Haggai
Zaccarias
Malachi
David
Solomon
Matathias
Judas Macabeus
Nehemiah
Esra
Zerubbabel
Jozadak (?)
Elisha
Onias
Samuel
Joshua
Noah
Baruch
Isaac
Abraham
Enoch

References

Bibliography (in Italian)
 AA.VV., Guida d'Italia, Firenze e provincia "Guida Rossa", Touring Club Italiano, Milano 2007.
 Enio Sindona, Cimabue e il momento figurativo pregiottesco, Rizzoli Editore, Milano, 1975. 
Chiara Frugoni, La voce delle immagini, Einaudi, Milano 2010.

External links

Mosaics
Florence
13th century in art
14th century in art